"You're Sorry" is a single produced and recorded by American house musician Todd Edwards. The track became his first number one on Billboard's Dance Club Songs Chart in its April 27, 2019 issue.

Track listing

Single

Remixes

Charts

Weekly charts

Year-end charts

See also
 List of number-one dance singles of 2019 (U.S.)

References

External links
Official video at YouTube

2019 singles
2019 songs
Todd Edwards songs